Cruz Martínez (born June 21, 1972) is an American record producer and musician. He is a former member of the Tejano band La Sombra. In 1999, he joined the cumbia music group Los Kumbia Kings, created by A.B. Quintanilla. In 2007, he created the band Los Super Reyes. He is married to Alicia Villarreal.

Career
Cruz Martínez's interest in music began at the age of twelve when he learned to play the piano with the help of one of his uncles. By the age of sixteen, Martínez began producing music and programming computers in the studio for the family band. By age sixteen, Cruz had received his first Grammy nomination. He joined the Tejano band La Sombra. A.B. Quintanilla formed the band Los Kumbia Kings in 1999, which Cruz Martínez would join and co-write and co-produce songs. Los Kumbia Kings received a total of twelve Grammy nominations and have set attendance records during performances at several venues. Aside from receiving much success with Los Kumbia Kings, Cruz Martínez also gained notoriety for his keyboard talents in the industry.

In 2004, Martínez produced, arranged, and wrote Alicia Villarreal's latest album, Cuando el Corazon Se Cruza which he received two Latin Grammys for Album of the Year in 2004, several 2005 and 2006 BMI songwriting awards, two Premios Lo Nuestro Awards for Best Regional/Mexican Album and Best Regional/Mexican Song and two Billboard nominations for Album and Song of the Year. As a producer/engineer, Cruz Martínez received two more Latin Grammys in 2006 for his Kumbia Kings live album Kumbia Kings Live. Martínez's latest project is Los Super Reyes. Cruz Martínez y Los Super Reyes have already had their hit single "Muévelo" reach the top of the radio charts in the United States, Spain, Japan, Germany and in Mexico. The group has since enjoyed major chart success and maintains a busy performance schedule in support of their recent record.Recently, Cruz was asked by Television giant TV Azteca / Azteca America to participate as a Judge for the 10th anniversary of the reality show La Academia and to produce the winner's album.

Discography

Albums with La Sombra
 One of a Kind (1989)
 The Chi-Town Boys R Back (1989)
 Good Boys Wear White (1990)
 Porque Te Quiero (1991)
 Intocable (1992)
 Ilusiones (1993)
 Caliente Dulce Amor (1994)
 Mas Que Todo (1995)

Albums with Kumbia Kings
 Amor, Familia y Respeto (1999)
 Shhh! (2001)
 All Mixed Up: Los Remixes (2002)
 4 (2003)
 Presents Kumbia Kings (2003)
 La Historia (2003)
 Los Remixes 2.0 (2004)
 Fuego (2004)
 Duetos (2005)
 Kumbia Kings Live (2006)

Albums with Los Super Reyes
 El Regreso de los Reyes (2007)
 Cumbia con Soul (2009)

Awards and nominations

See also
 La Sombra
 Kumbia Kings
 Los Super Reyes

References

External links
 
 Los Super Reyes Myspace
 FuryStreet Myspace
 
 Q&A Sessions: Cruz Martinez, nocheLatina - Dec 2009

 
1972 births
20th-century American keyboardists
20th-century American musicians
20th-century American male musicians
21st-century American keyboardists
21st-century American musicians
21st-century American male musicians
American child musicians
American expatriates in Mexico
American musicians of Mexican descent
Cumbia musicians
EMI Latin artists
Hispanic and Latino American musicians
Kumbia Kings members
Latin music record producers
Latin music songwriters
Living people
Los Super Reyes members
Musicians from Chicago
Musicians from Texas
Record producers from Illinois
Record producers from Texas
Songwriters from Illinois
Songwriters from Texas
Tejano pop musicians
Warner Music Latina artists